Macleay Vocational College (MVC), also known as Macleay Valley Workplace Learning Centre Inc., is a secondary school in West Kempsey, New South Wales, Australia.  Mark Morrison is the principal. The school is for students who have experienced difficulties at previous schools.  Established in 2001, the Macleay Vocational College (MVC) is part of the Macleay Valley Workplace Learning Centre Inc., a not-for-profit education and training provider. ABC News (Australia) described it as an institution for "last chance" individuals.

In 1999, the concept of a Vocational High School in Kempsey NSW, for the most disadvantaged youth in education was envisaged and in the year 2000 the accreditation process was begun. Jann Eason was the founding Principal.

Two schools, Newington College and Queenwood School, regularly assist Macleay Vocational College through cash donations.

Facilities
The school has a creche which served as a library until Principal Mark Morrison orchestrated its conversion circa 2012.

References

Further reading
  - on YouTube
Te Riele, K. (2008) Negotiating Risk and Hope. Alternative Education for Marginalised Youth. Extended Research Report for Macleay Vocational College. June 2008. UTS ECRG-funded project.
University of Technology Sydney, Study of ‘Doing School Differently’, Chapter 10 Pedagogy,  Dr. Kitty Te Riele, Sage Publication 2009
Publication:  Macleay Vocational College Inaugural School Magazine 2002–2009. A Supportive, Dynamic Learning Environment. Ms. Jann Eason, Founder of the Macleay Vocational College Kempsey, 1999]

External links
 Macleay Valley Workplace Learning Centre Inc.

High schools in New South Wales
2001 establishments in Australia
Educational institutions established in 2001